PC-MOS/386 is a multi-user, multitasking computer operating system produced by The Software Link (TSL), announced at COMDEX in November 1986 for February 1987 release. PC-MOS/386, a successor to PC-MOS, can run many MS-DOS programs on the host machine or a terminal connected to it. Unlike MS-DOS, PC-MOS/386 is optimized for the Intel 80386 processor; however early versions will run on any x86 computer. PC-MOS/386 used to be proprietary, but it was released as open-source software in 2017.

History
The last commercial version produced was v5.01, compatible with MS-DOS 5. It required a memory management unit (MMU) to support memory protection, so was not compatible with 8086 and 8088 processors.

MMU support for 286 class machines was provided using a proprietary hardware shim inserted between the processor and its socket. 386 machines did not require any special hardware.

Multi-user operation suffered from the limitations of the day including the inability of the processor to schedule and partition running processes. Typically swapping from a foreground to a background process on the same terminal used the keyboard to generate an interrupt and then swap the processes. The cost of RAM (over US$500/Mb in 1987) and the slow and expensive hard disks of the day limited performance.

PC-MOS terminals could be x86 computers running terminal emulation software communicating at 9600 or 19200 baud, connected via serial cables. However, the greatest benefit was reached when using standard, "dumb" terminals which shared the resources of the then central 386-based processor. Speeds above this required specialized hardware boards which increased cost, but the speed was not a serious limitation for interacting with text-based programs.

PC-MOS also figured prominently in the lawsuit Arizona Retail Systems, Inc. v. The Software Link, Inc., where Arizona Retail Systems claimed The Software Link violated implied warranties on PC-MOS. The case is notable because The Software Link argued that it had disclaimed the implied warranties via a license agreement on the software's shrinkwrap licensing. The result of the case, which Arizona Retail Systems won, helped to establish US legal precedent regarding the enforceability of shrinkwrap licenses.

There was a year 2000 problem-like issue in this operating system, first manifesting on 1 August 2012 rather than 1 January 2000: files created on the system from this date on would no longer work.

On 21 July 2017 PCMOS/386 was relicensed under GPL v3 and its source code uploaded to GitHub,  with the "year 2012" issue corrected.

Commands
Commands supported by PC-MOS Version 4 are:

 ABORT
 ADDDEV
 ADDTASK
 ALIAS
 AUTOCD
 BATECHO
 BREAK
 CALL
 RETURN
 CD
 CLASS
 CLS
 COMMAND
 COMPFILE
 COPY
 DATE
 DEBUG
 DIR
 DIRMAP
 DISKCOPY
 DISKID
 DOT
 ECHO
 ED
 ENVSIZE
 ERASE
 EXCEPT
 EXPORT
 FILEMODE
 FLUSH
 FOR
 FORMAT
 GOTO
 HDSETUP
 HELP
 IF
 IMPORT
 INSERT
 KEY
 KEYMAP
 MD
 MORE
 MOS
 MOSADM
 MSORT
 MSYS
 NEXT
 ONLY
 PATH
 PAUSE
 PRINT
 PROMPT
 RD
 REL
 REM
 REMDEV
 REMTASK
 RENAME
 SEARCH
 SET
 SIGNOFF
 SIGNON
 SPOOL
 STOP
 SWITCH
 TEXT
 ENDTEXT
 TIME
 TYPE
 VERIFY
 WVER

See also
 DoubleDOS
 Multiuser DOS - Digital Research's unrelated multi-user operating system
 VM/386 - unrelated multi-tasking DOS environment
 Virtual DOS machine
 Multiuser DOS Federation
 FreeDOS
 Timeline of operating systems

References

1987 software
Discontinued operating systems
Disk operating systems
DOS variants
Formerly proprietary software
Free software operating systems
Assembly language software
X86 operating systems